The Peugeot RCZ is a 2+2 sports coupé designed and marketed by PSA Group under the Peugeot marque and assembled by Magna Steyr between 2009 and 2015. It debuted at the Frankfurt Auto Show in 2009.

History

The vehicle was showcased as the 308 RCZ concept car at the 2007 Frankfurt Auto Show. The RCZ was developed as a showcase concept car but after receiving considerable critical acclaim, Peugeot put the RCZ into production, retaining much from the concept. The RCZ has a double-bubble roof inspired by Zagato.

Launched into production in April 2010 and available in almost 80 countries , the RCZ was formally introduced at the Frankfurt Auto Show in 2009. Petrol engines are based on Prince series while diesel is part of the HDi series. The RCZ was developed under code name "T75".

The 30,000th RCZ was assembled in June 2011. The 50,000th RCZ was built on 14 February 2013 and was painted red. After a production period of almost six years, the last Peugeot RCZ was assembled in the Magna Steyr Graz plant in September 2015.

Specifications

Engines

Equipment
The RCZ offered optional electric heated and adjustable seating with driver's memory, leather seats and dashboard and hill assist function. Other options include 19-inch alloy wheels and a JBL sound system. An Elan or Sportif Kit option pack could be selected to change the colour finish of the roof, door mirrors and front grille. While the RCZ has rear seats, they are not large enough for adults to sit comfortably in.

Derivatives

RCZ Hybrid4 Concept
The RCZ Hybrid4 concept was announced with a 2.0 L HDi FAP  engine and a  electric motor connected to a 6-speed electronically controlled gearbox.

RCZ R

In November 2012, Peugeot announced their intention of building a more powerful, performance oriented RCZ. In July 2013, the first official pictures of the car were released. It also features uprated 380mm Alcon brakes and suspension, a significantly reduced curb weight and a Torsen front differential, like that found on the mk2 Ford Focus RS, to reduce the inevitable torque steer faced by a front-wheel-drive car with this level of power output. The RCZ R went on sale in January 2014 at £31,995.

Only 305 RCZ Rs were brought to the UK of the 3,054 that were manufactured.

Special editions
The RCZ Allure is a special edition of the 1.6 THP156 with 6-speed Tiptronic transmission and 18-inch wheels.

The Asphalt is limited edition (500 units) version of the RCZ. It includes 19-inch black and silver alloy wheels, black leather sport seats.

The RCZ Brownstone is a limited edition available exclusively in Germany in metallic brown paint with silver racing stripes. Inside, the special version is finished in brown, with Cohiba leather and Alcantara trim.

The RCZ Magnetic is available exclusively in the UK, with production limited to 170 units. Models are available in pearlescent black with Flame Red leather sports seats or white with black leather sports seats, with matte black roof arches and a black grille, brake calipers and door mirrors. They also feature a soft touch leather sports steering wheel and a short shift gear lever.

The RCZ Raidillon is available in Belgium and Luxembourg with production limited to 55 pieces. The stylish metal colour Guaranja Brown is unique to this version. Inside, the Cohiba Nappa leather and Alcantara upholstery has additional embroidery "Raidillon" lettering in the backrest.

Reception and awards
The Peugeot RCZ received the Top Gear '2010 Coupe of the Year award', three times in a row the Auto Express 'Best Coupé of the Year', the Auto Express readers 'Special Design Award 2010' and the 'Best of the Best' Red Dot Award for its design. From 2010 to 2014, the Peugeot RCZ has been awarded five successive times 'Best Sports Car' by Diesel Car magazine. According to Ian Robertson, editor of DieselCar: 'The Peugeot RCZ offers a rewarding driving experience, agile handling and a well sorted ride, and frugal diesel power. It really is the icing on the cake for the sexily styled sports coupé'.

Autocar magazine said of the RCZ R as 'things look pretty good when you compare it to its rivals, too. The Audi TT is dull to drive and quite aged now, while the Mini Coupé JCW 1.6 is nowhere near as finessed as the Peugeot.'

Motorsport

A modified version of the RCZ is used in the Peugeot RCZ Racing Cup Italy one make race. The car used is known as the RCZ Peugeot Sport, which features an increased power output from 200 to 250 bhp, uprated brakes and an adjustable rear spoiler amongst standard motorsport preparations such as weight reduction and a roll cage. Racing versions of the RCZ have also competed successfully in the 24 Hours of Nürburgring, claiming class victories with diesel based variants in 2010 and 2011 and with the RCZ Peugeot Sport in 2012.
As of 2021 Peugeot is considering to resurrect the RCZ as an all-electric version of their halo car with more details to be followed.

Sales and production

Notes

References

External links

 Official Peugeot page
 Official UK RCZ website

RCZ
Cars introduced in 2009
2010s cars
Coupés
Cars of Austria
Front-wheel-drive sports cars